East Sydney, an electoral district of the Legislative Assembly in the Australian state of New South Wales was created in 1859 and abolished in 1894.


Election results

Elections in the 1890s

November 1891 by-election

1891

April 1891 by-election

Elections in the 1880s

1889

1887

1885

1884 by-election

1883 by-election 2

1883 by-election 1

1882

1880

Elections in the 1870s

1879 by-election

1877

1877 by-election

1874-75

1874 by-election

June 1872 by-election

May 1872 by-election

1872

1870 by-election

Elections in the 1860s

1869-70

1867 by-election

1866 by-election

1865 by-election

1864-65

1861 by-election

1860

1860 by-election

Elections in the 1850s

1859 by-election

1859

Notes

References

New South Wales state electoral results by district